KFMP-LP, VHF analog channel 6, was a low-powered television station licensed to Lubbock, Texas, United States. The station was owned by Venture Technologies Group, LLC.

History
Founded on December 9, 2004 as K06OC by Venture Technologies. It never made it on the air until four years later. Beginning in February 2009, KFMP-LP used the audio signal available to analog television channel 6 (87.75 MHz) to broadcast as Lubbock's KFMP, Channel 8-7-7... The Only Alternative with an alternative format. Channel 87.7 was Lubbock's first official alternative formatted "radio" station (KBTE briefly stunted as 'The Bat' before signing on as Rhythmic 'The Beat' and KFMX shifted to alternative briefly in the 90s before shifting back to active rock). On-air personalities included Dick & Skibba (mornings, formerly heard on KLSX in Los Angeles and KSCF San Diego) and Coty (middays, formerly heard on KZII.) The station was unique in that all programming originated in the SAG building on Wilshire Boulevard in Los Angeles but intended only for Lubbock.

Current
After simulcasting KRFE AM 580 for some of 2010, KFMP-LP returned to a rock format identified as 'Hub City's Rock'.

Venture Technologies surrendered KFMP-LP's license to the Federal Communications Commission for cancellation on December 3, 2020.

External links
 

Television stations in Lubbock, Texas
Television channels and stations established in 2008
2008 establishments in Texas
Television channels and stations disestablished in 2020
2020 disestablishments in Texas
Defunct television stations in the United States